Mixotoxodon ("mixture Toxodon") is an extinct genus of notoungulate of the family Toxodontidae inhabiting South America, Central America and parts of southern North America during the Pleistocene epoch, from 1,800,000—12,000 years ago.

Description 

Mixotoxodon is known by fragmentary remains, usually mandible fragments and teeth. Although the general appearance probably was very similar to another toxodontid from the Pleistocene, the better known Toxodon, their fossils shown that the outer borders of the symphysis in the lower jaw don't diverge anteriorly, and the incisors form a semicircular structure that protrude less than the incisors of Toxodon; the snout was cylindrical, instead of the broad hippo-like muzzle of Toxodon. The straight snout and the narrow lower incisors closely packed, suggest that this animal had a different feeding strategy compared to their southern relative, although the teeth of both genera were adapted to deal with abrasive food.

Mixotoxodon is known from a single species, M. larensis. Mixotoxodon is the only notoungulate known to have migrated out of South America during the Great American Interchange. Its fossils have been found in northern South America, in Central America, in Veracruz and Michoacán, Mexico (with a possible find in Tamaulipas), and eastern Texas, USA. The genus was also one of the last surviving notoungulates, along with related genera such as the better-known Toxodon. The name refers to the fact that Mixotoxodon combines characteristics typical of different toxodontid subfamilies.

Phylogeny 
The cladogram below is based in the study published by Analía Forasiepi and colleagues (2014), showing the position of Mixotoxodon inside Toxodontidae:

Fossil distribution 
This list indicates the countries and places where Mixotoxodon fossils have been found. The list follows Rincón, 2011, unless otherwise indicated:

North America
 United States
 Harris County, Texas
 Mexico
 Hihuitlán, Michoacán
 La Estribera, Veracruz (Polaco et al., 2004)
 Guatemala
 Santa Amelia River, Petén Department (Woodburne, 1969)
 Honduras
 Yeroconte, Lempira department (Webb and Perrigo, 1984)
 Orillas del Humuya, Comayagua department
 El Salvador
 Tomayate, San Salvador department (Cisneros, 2005)
 Cuscatlán Formation, Barranca del Sisimico, San Vicente department
 Hormiguero, San Miguel department (Webb and Perrigo, 1984)
 Nicaragua 
 El Bosque, Estelí department (Leidy, 1886)
 Costa Rica
 Bajo de los Barrantes, Alajuela province (Laurito, 1993; Valerio, 1939; Spencer et al., 1997)
 Panama
 Ocú, Herrera Province (Gazin, 1956)

South America
 Colombia
 Rotinet Formation, Chívolo, Magdalena (De Porta 1959; Villarroel and Clavijo, 2005)
 Venezuela
 Mene de Inciarte, Zulia (Rincón, 2011) 
 Quebrada Ocando, Falcón State (Bocquentin-Villanueva, 1984)
 Muaco, Falcón State (Royo y Gómez, 1960, Bocquentin-Villanueva, 1979)
 Cerro Misión, Falcón State (Rincón, 2004)
 Zumbador Cave, Falcón State
 Agua Viva del Totumo, Lara State (Karsten, 1886)
 San Miguel, Lara Sate (Van Frank, 1957)
 El Tocuyo, Lara State
 El Breal de Orocual, Monagas State (Rincón et al., 2009)
 Brazil
 Juruá River, Acre State (Paula Couto, 1982; Rancy, 1981)
 Araras/Periquitos, Rondônia
 Bolivia 
 Cara Cara, Beni Department (Hoffstetter, 1968)
 Argentina
 Dique Los Quiroga, Santiago del Estero

References

Bibliography and further reading 

 
 Chimento, Nicolás R., and Federico L. Agnolin. Mamíferos del Pleistoceno Superior de Santiago del Estero (Argentina) y sus afinidades paleobiogeográficas. Papéis Avulsos de Zoologia 51.6 (2011): 83-100.
 Cisneros, J.C. 2005. New Pleistocene vertebrate fauna from El Salvador. Revista Brasileira de Paleontologia, 8(3):239-255.
 De Porta, Jaime., 1959: Nueva subespecie de Toxodóntido del Cuaternario de Colombia.- Boletín de Geolología, Universidad Industrial de Santander, 3: 55-61.
 Elissamburu A., 2012. Estimación de la masa corporal en géneros del Orden Notoungulata. Estudios Geológicos, Vol 68, No 1, doi:10.3989/egeol.40336.133
 Laurito, César Alberto. Análisis topológico y sistemático del Toxodonte de Bajo de los Barrantes, provincia de Alajuela, Costa Rica. Revista Geológica de América Central 16 (1993).
 Lucas, Spencer G., Guillermo E. Alvarado, and Eduardo Vega. The pleistocene mammals of Costa Rica. Journal of Vertebrate Paleontology 17.2 (1997): 413-427.
 
 MacFadden, Bruce J. (2005). Diet and habitat of toxodont megaherbivores (Mammalia, Notoungulata) from the late Quaternary of South and Central America. Quaternary Research 64 (2005) 113 – 124.
 McKenna, Malcolm C., and Bell, Susan K. 1997. Classification of Mammals Above the Species Level. Columbia University Press, New York, 631 pp. 
 Paula-Couto, C. (1979). Capítulo XXI, Ordem Notoungulata Roth, 1903. In Tratado de Paleomastozoologia. Academia Brasileira de Ciências, 590 p, Rio de Janeiro.
 Rincón, Ascanio D. Los mamíferos fósiles del Pleistoceno de la cueva del Zumbador (fa. 116), Estado Falcón, Venezuela. Boletín de la Sociedad Venezolana de Espeleología 37 (2003): 18-26.
 Rincón, Ascanio D. New remains of Mixotoxodon larensis Van Frank 1957 (Mammalia: Notoungulata) from Mene de Inciarte tar pit, north-western Venezuela. Interciencia 36.12 (2011): 894-899.
 Van Frank, R. 1957. A fossil collection from northern . 1, Toxodontidae (Mammalia, Notoungulata). American Museum Novitates, 1850:1-38.
 Villarroel A., C. & J. Clavijo ( 2005). Los mamíferos fósiles y las edades de las sedimentitas continentales del Neógeno de la Costa Caribe Colombiana. Revista de la Academia Colombiana de Ciencias 29 (112): 345-356. ISSN 0370-3908.

Toxodonts
Pleistocene first appearances
Holocene extinctions
Pleistocene mammals of North America
Irvingtonian
Pleistocene Costa Rica
Pleistocene El Salvador
Pleistocene Guatemala
Pleistocene Honduras
Pleistocene Mexico
Pleistocene Nicaragua
Pleistocene Panama
Pleistocene United States
Pleistocene mammals of South America
Uquian
Ensenadan
Lujanian
Pleistocene Argentina
Pleistocene Bolivia
Pleistocene Brazil
Pleistocene Colombia
Pleistocene Venezuela
Fossils of Costa Rica
Fossils of El Salvador
Fossils of Guatemala
Fossils of Honduras
Fossils of Mexico
Fossils of Nicaragua
Fossils of Panama
Fossils of Argentina
Fossils of Bolivia
Fossils of Brazil
Fossils of Colombia
Fossils of Venezuela
Fossil taxa described in 1957
Prehistoric placental genera